Cornelis Vreedenburgh (25 August 1880 – 27 June 1946) was a Dutch painter. His work was part of the painting event in the art competition at the 1924 Summer Olympics. Vreedenburgh's work was included in the 1939 exhibition and sale Onze Kunst van Heden (Our Art of Today) at the Rijksmuseum in Amsterdam.

Gallery

References

External links

1880 births
1946 deaths
19th-century Dutch painters
20th-century Dutch painters
Dutch male painters
Olympic competitors in art competitions
People from Woerden
19th-century Dutch male artists
20th-century Dutch male artists